Listeria marthii is a species of bacteria. It is a Gram-positive, motile, facultatively anaerobic, non-spore-forming bacillus. It is non-pathogenic, and non-hemolytic. The species was first isolated from Finger Lakes National Forest in New York. It is named after Elmer H. Marth, a researcher of L. monocytogenes, and was first published in 2010. L. marthii was the first new species of Listeria proposed since 1985.

Listeria marthii has mainly been isolated from a specific area in the Finger Lakes National Forest. However, L. marthii strains may be mischaracterized as L. innocua due to biochemical similarities between the two species.

References

Further reading
Sauders, Brian D., et al. "Diversity of Listeria species in urban and natural environments." Applied and Environmental Microbiology 78.12 (2012): 4420–4433.

External links
LPSN
Type strain of Listeria marthii at BacDive -  the Bacterial Diversity Metadatabase

marthii
Bacteria described in 2010